Aleksandar Aleksiev (born 5 November 1992) is a Bulgarian cyclist.

Major results

2010
 3rd Overall Tour of Mevlana Juniors
 10th Fair Cities Trophy 2
2012
 3rd Road race, National Road Championships
2013
 1st Stage 1 Tour de Serbie
2014
 1st Grand Prix Al Massira, Les Challenges de la Marche Verte
 3rd Road race, National Road Championships
 8th Trophée de la Maison Royale, Challenge du Prince
2016
 1st  Time trial, National Road Championships
 1st Stage 5 Tour of Bulgaria
2017
 2nd Time trial, National Road Championships
 2nd Overall Tour of Bulgaria North
 3rd Road race, National Road Championships
 8th Overall Tour of Bihor
 10th Overall Tour of Bulgaria South

References

1992 births
Living people
Bulgarian male cyclists
People from Stara Zagora Province